Benjamin Le Fevre (October 8, 1838 – March 7, 1922) was a nineteenth-century American politician and Civil War veteran from Ohio. He served four terms in the United States House of Representatives from 1879 to 1887.

Biography
Born near Maplewood, Ohio, Le Fevre attended Miami University in 1858 and 1859 and studied law in Sidney, Ohio.

Civil War 
At the outbreak of the Civil War, he enlisted in the Union Army in 1861, serving until the end of the war, being mustered out as major of the 15th Ohio Volunteer Infantry Regiment.

Political career 
He was a member of the Ohio House of Representatives in 1865 and was nominated as a Democrat for Secretary of State of Ohio in 1866. He was United States consul in Nuremberg, Bavaria from 1867 to 1869.

Congress 
Le Fevre was elected a Democrat to the United States House of Representatives in 1878, serving from 1879 to 1887, not being a candidate for renomination in 1886.

Later career and death 
Afterwards, he was a mail contract agent for the Erie Railroad, had retired from political activities and engaged in agricultural pursuits in Salem Township, Shelby County, Ohio.

Le Fevre died in Atlantic City, New Jersey, on March 7, 1922, and was interred in Glen Cemetery in Salem Township.

See also

External links
 Retrieved on 2008-08-12

1838 births
1922 deaths
Democratic Party members of the Ohio House of Representatives
19th-century American railroad executives
Miami University alumni
People of Ohio in the American Civil War
People from Shelby County, Ohio
Democratic Party members of the United States House of Representatives from Ohio